Cryphia rectilinea is a moth of the family Noctuidae. It is found in the Balkans, Italy, Turkey, Lebanon and Israel.

Life cycle 
Adults have a flight period from May to September. There is one generation per year.

The larvae probably feed on lichen.

References

External links
The Acronictinae, Bryophilinae, Hypenodinae and Hypeninae of Israel

Cryphia
Moths of the Middle East
Moths described in 1909